Tyne Cyclist and Pedestrian Tunnel was Britain's first purpose-built cycling tunnel. It runs under the River Tyne between Howdon and Jarrow, and was opened in 1951, heralded as a contribution to the Festival of Britain. The original cost was £833,000 and the tunnel was used by 20,000 people a day. 
It consists of two tunnels running in parallel, one for pedestrian use with a  diameter, and a larger  diameter tunnel for pedal cyclists. The tunnels are over 60 years old and are Grade II listed buildings.

At each end, the tunnels are connected to surface buildings by two escalators and a lift. The Waygood-Otis escalators have 306 wooden steps each, and are the original models from 1951. The Tyne Tunnel escalators remain the longest wooden escalators in the world.

20,000 people a month used the pedestrian tunnel in 2013.

Refurbishment 
In a refitting phase the escalators and lift shafts were due to be upgraded by October 2010 to early 2011 at a cost of £500,000. A £6,000,000 refurbishment was due to take place in 2011, but multiple delays pushed the reopening date to summer 2019.

In 2012, contractor GB Building Solutions of Balliol Business Park, Newcastle, was appointed to carry out the £4.9 million refurbishment which included the replacement of two of the original four escalators with inclined lifts and the replacement of the tunnels' ageing mechanical and electrical systems.  However, GB Building Solutions went into administration in 2015, delaying the project.

The two remaining escalators, which are original and of historical significance, will be opened up to public view and illuminated with feature lighting.

New lighting, CCTV, control and communications systems were installed, in addition to carrying out repairs to the tunnel structure itself and to the historic finishes within the tunnel such as the tiling and panelling. The concrete floor sections were also refurbished or replaced. During the closure, a free, timetabled shuttle bus for pedestrians and cyclists was in operation between 6am and 8pm, seven days a week, 364 days a year.

The tunnel reopened at midday on 7 August 2019, operating initially for 14 hours a day until installation of the new inclined lifts is completed when the service will be 24 hours. By December 2019 monthly journeys were above 20,000 with around 25% of users being cyclists.
People using the tunnels can link with cycle routes at either end, the 317 bus service for Wallsend or Whitley Bay from the north end or take a short walk to the Jarrow bus and Metro station from the south end.  Mobility scooters can access the tunnels and dogs on leads are allowed.

See also 

 Tyne Tunnel - vehicular tunnels

External links
http://www.tynepedestrianandcyclisttunnels.co.uk/

References

Transport in Tyne and Wear
Crossings of the River Tyne
Grade II listed buildings in Tyne and Wear
Tunnels completed in 1951
Tunnels in Tyne and Wear
Grade II listed tunnels
Pedestrian tunnels in the United Kingdom
Cycling tunnels in the United Kingdom